Philip Francis Thomas (September 12, 1810October 2, 1890) was an American lawyer, mathematician and politician. He served in the Maryland House of Delegates, was the 28th Governor of Maryland from 1848 to 1851, and was Comptroller of Maryland from 1851 to 1853. He was appointed as the 23rd United States Secretary of the Treasury in 1860 in the Buchanan administration. After unsuccessfully standing for the United States Senate in 1878, he returned to the Maryland House of Delegates, and later resumed the practice of law.

Governor of Maryland 
Born in Easton, Maryland, he graduated from Dickinson College in Pennsylvania in 1830. He studied law and became a lawyer in Easton. He was a delegate to the Maryland's constitutional convention in 1836 and a member of the Maryland House of Delegates in 1838, 1843, and 1845. He went back to his law practice, but returned to politics eight years later when he was elected the 28th Governor of Maryland, a position he held through 1851. While Governor, in 1849 he commissioned Maryland's contribution to the Washington Monument, a marble building stone upon which the colonial Sparrow Seal of Maryland was engraved.

From 1851 to 1853, he was Comptroller of Maryland and then collector of the port of Baltimore from 1853 to 1860, and United States Commissioner of Patents for a fragment of that year (February through December).

Secretary of the Treasury 
Thomas was appointed United States Secretary of the Treasury in the Presidential Cabinet of President James Buchanan and served from December 12, 1860 until his resignation on January 14, 1861. 

When Howell Cobb, the 22nd Secretary of the Treasury resigned in 1860, Buchanan appointed Thomas the 23rd Secretary. Thomas reluctantly accepted the position. Immediately upon entering office, Thomas had to market a bond to pay the interest on the public debt. There was little faith in the stability of the country due to the threat of secession by the Southern United States, and war appeared inevitable. Northern bankers refused to invest in Thomas's loan, wary that the money would go to the South. Following Interior Secretary Jacob Thompson, Thomas resigned after only a month in response to his failure to obtain the loan.

Later political career 
Two years later, he again became a member of the Maryland House of Delegates in 1863. He presented credentials as a senator-elect to the United States Senate for the term beginning March 4, 1867, but was not seated as a person "who had given aid and comfort" to the Confederate cause by way of giving money to his son "to aid him in joining the rebel army." The charge against him was contested in The New York Times as "partisan intolerance," and in The Chicago Times as "lawless despotism." He was then elected as a Democrat to the 44th Congress from the 1st Congressional district of Maryland, serving from 1875 to 1877, and declined to be a candidate for renomination in 1876. He holds the record for the longest non-contiguous service within the U.S. House.

He was an unsuccessful candidate for election to the United States Senate in 1878. He returned to the Maryland House of Delegates twice, in 1878 and 1883, and then resumed the practice of law in Easton.

Death and burial 

He died in Baltimore in 1890 and is buried in Spring Hill Cemetery in Easton.

References

External links

Philip Francis Thomas at the United States Department of the Treasury

|-

|-

|-

|-

|-

1810 births
1890 deaths
19th-century American politicians
Buchanan administration cabinet members
Comptrollers of Maryland
Dickinson College alumni
Democratic Party governors of Maryland
Democratic Party members of the Maryland House of Delegates
People from Easton, Maryland
United States Commissioners of Patents
United States Secretaries of the Treasury
Democratic Party members of the United States House of Representatives from Maryland